The Penske PC-22 was a CART Penske Racing car which competed in the 1993 season. It raced in all sixteen events, scoring eight wins, three with Emerson Fittipaldi and five with Paul Tracy. The most remarkable success of the PC-22 was the 1993 Indianapolis 500 win by Fittipaldi, placed 2nd at the end of the season, missing the championship by only 8 points. The car was designed by Nigel Bennett as a radical departure from the basic concept of the previous Penske cars.

Racing history

The PC-22 debuted at 1993 Australian FAI IndyCar Grand Prix, noted for the sensational debut win of Nigel Mansell, qualifying 2nd with Fittipaldi and 3rd with Tracy. In the race, Fittipaldi scored a 2nd place finish, while Tracy retired for electrical problems. At Phoenix, the first oval race of the season, both Penskes went off, while in Long Beach Tracy scored the first win for the PC-22. In Indianapolis, Fittipaldi qualified 9th (220.150 mph), and won the event exploiting Mansell's inexperience on oval racing and Andretti's handling problems, after their dominating runs. After two races, Milwaukee and Detroit, with only one podium finish, the Penske come back to victory in Portland, with Fittipaldi 1st and Tracy 3rd. Two 1-2 wins followed, in Cleveland and Toronto, with Tracy 1st and Fittipaldi 2nd in both occasions. Nigel Mansell scored two wins at Michigan and New Hampshire as a major push for his championship bid, while Fittipaldi and Tracy at New Hampshire scored a 2nd and 3rd place respectively. Tracy won at Road America 
and Fittipaldi at Mid-Ohio, but Mansell clinched the title with his 5th season win at Nazareth. Tracy scored a 1st place at the final race of season in Laguna Seca.

Legacy
The highly successful PC-23 that competed in the 1994 IndyCar season. was modeled after its predecessor, the PC-22. The Penske PC-23 was one of the most dominant open wheel race cars ever developed. It won both the 1994 CART season, and the 1994 Indianapolis 500 with Al Unser Jr., together with Emerson Fittipaldi and Paul Tracy scoring 12 wins out of 16 in total, collecting 10 pole positions and 28 podium finishes, in a season that saw Penske also take the Constructor's Cup, and the Manufacturer's Cup with the Ilmor-Mercedes-Benz engine.

Complete Indy Car World Series results
(key) (Results in bold indicate pole position; results in italics indicate fastest lap) 

*Includes points scored by other cars.

References

External links
 Penske PC-22 at dlg.speedfreaks.org 
 penskeracing.com

Indianapolis 500
Team Penske
American Championship racing cars